Evérard H. Daigle (December 2, 1925 – March 2, 2022) was a Canadian politician. He served in the Legislative Assembly of New Brunswick from 1974 to 1987, as a French-speaking Liberal member for the constituency of Grand Falls. He was named to the Order of New Brunswick in 2010. He died in Grand Falls, New Brunswick on March 2, 2022, at the age of 96.

References

1925 births
2022 deaths
Canadian businesspeople
New Brunswick Liberal Association MLAs
Members of the Legislative Assembly of New Brunswick
Mayors of places in New Brunswick
Members of the Order of New Brunswick
People from Grand Falls, New Brunswick